Old Town Historic District may refer to:

in the United States
(by state then city)
 Old Town Historic District (Huntsville, Alabama), listed on the National Register of Historic Places (NRHP)
 Old Town Historic District (Selma, Alabama), NRHP-listed
 Old Town, Eureka, California, NRHP-listed
 Monterey Old Town Historic District, Monterey, California, listed on the NRHP in California
 Old Towne, Orange Historic District, Orange, California, NRHP-listed
 Old Town San Diego State Historic Park, San Diego, California, NRHP-listed
 Old Town Fort Collins, Fort Collins, Colorado, listed on the NRHP in Colorado
 Old Town Hall Commercial Historic District, Wilmington, Delaware, NRHP-listed
 Historic Old Town Commercial District, Lake Worth Beach, Florida, NRHP-listed
 Old Town Sebastian Historic District, East, Sebastian, Florida, NRHP-listed
 Old Town Sebastian Historic District, West, Sebastian, Florida, NRHP-listed
 Brunswick Old Town, Brunswick, Georgia, listed on the NRHP in Georgia
 Brunswick Old Town Historic District, Brunswick, Georgia, listed on the NRHP in Georgia
 Old Town Triangle Historic District, Chicago, Illinois, listed on the NRHP in Illinois
 Old Town Historic District (Ames, Iowa), listed on the NRHP in Iowa
 Old Town Historic District (Hartford, Kentucky), listed on the NRHP in Kentucky
Boxborough Old Town Center, Boxborough, Massachusetts, listed on the NRHP in Massachusetts
 Old Town Center Historic District, Eastham, Massachusetts, listed on the NRHP in Massachusetts
 Old Town Historic District (North Attleborough, Massachusetts), listed on the NRHP in Massachusetts
 Old Town Hall Historic District (Salem, Massachusetts), listed on the NRHP in Massachusetts
Old Town Historic District (Kansas City, Missouri), listed on the NRHP in Missouri
 Old Town Residential Historic District (Las Vegas, New Mexico), listed on the NRHP in New Mexico
 Old Town Green Historic District, Huntington, New York, listed on the NRHP in New York
 Old Town Hall Historic District (Huntington, New York), listed on the NRHP in New York
 Old Town Plantation, Battleboro, North Carolina, listed on the NRHP in North Carolina
Old Town Historic District (Bend, Oregon), listed on the NRHP in Oregon
 Portland Skidmore/Old Town Historic District, Portland, OR, listed on the NRHP in Oregon
 Old Town Historic District (Clearfield, Pennsylvania), listed on the NRHP in Pennsylvania
 Museums and  historical sites (Bluffton, SC)
 Old Town (Franklin, Tennessee), listed on the NRHP in Tennessee
 Old Town Historic District (Arlington, Texas), listed on the NRHP in Texas
 Old Town Residential Historic District (Palestine, Texas), listed on the NRHP in Texas
 Old Town Historic District (Harrisonburg, Virginia), listed on the NRHP in Virginia
 Petersburg Old Town Historic District, Petersburg, Virginia, listed on the NRHP in Virginia
 Ravenswood "Old Town" Historic District, Ravenswood, West Virginia, listed on the NRHP in West Virginia

See also
Old Town (disambiguation)
 Old Town Hall Historic District (disambiguation)
 Old Town Residential Historic District (disambiguation)